Pablo Andrés Aguilar Palacios (born 21 February 1995) is a former Guatemalan footballer.

Career

Youth & College
Aguilar played four years of college soccer at the University of Virginia between 2014 and 2017. He was named Second Team All-Atlantic Coast Conference in 2016, and USC Third Team All-South Region and Second Team All-Atlantic Coast Conference in 2017.

While at college, Aguilar played with USL PDL side Reading United AC in 2017.

Professional 
On 21 January 2017, Aguilar was selected 59th overall in the 2018 MLS SuperDraft by Houston Dynamo. Aguilar joined Houston's United Soccer League affiliate side Rio Grande Valley FC Toros in March 2018. He made his professional debut on 16 March 2018, where he opened the scoring in a 1-1 draw with Saint Louis FC.

On 27 December 2018, it was confirmed, that Aguilar had signed with Antigua in the Liga Nacional de Fútbol de Guatemala.

Retirement
On 13 July 2022, Aguilar announced his retirement from professional football, citing to more focus on his family’s business.

International
He made his debut for Guatemala national football team on 15 November 2018 in a friendly against Israel which Guatemala lost 0–7.

Honours
Antigua 
Liga Nacional de Guatemala: Clausura 2019

Personal
Aguilar has dual citizenship with Guatemala and the United States.

References

External links 
 Virginia Cavaliers Profile
 
 
 
 

1995 births
Living people
Association football midfielders
Expatriate soccer players in the United States
Guatemalan emigrants to the United States
Guatemalan expatriate footballers
Guatemalan footballers
Guatemala international footballers
Houston Dynamo FC draft picks
Reading United A.C. players
Rio Grande Valley FC Toros players
Antigua GFC players
Soccer players from Florida
Sportspeople from Guatemala City
USL Championship players
USL League Two players
Liga Nacional de Fútbol de Guatemala players
Virginia Cavaliers men's soccer players